For this list of lost films, a lost film is defined as one of which no part of a print is known to have survived.  For films in which any portion of the footage remains (including trailers), see List of incomplete or partially lost films.

Reasons for loss
Films may go missing for a number of reasons. One major contributing factor is the common use of nitrate film until the early 1950s. This type of film is highly flammable, and there have been several devastating fires, such as the Universal Pictures fire in 1924, the 1937 Fox vault fire and the 1965 MGM vault fire.

Black-and-white film prints judged to be otherwise worthless were sometimes incinerated to salvage the meager scrap value of the silver image particles in their emulsions. Films have disappeared when production companies went bankrupt. Occasionally, a studio would remake a film and destroy the earlier version. Silent films in particular were once seen as having no further commercial value and were simply junked to clear out expensive storage space.

Statistics on lost films
Martin Scorsese's Film Foundation claims that "half of all American films made before 1950 and over 90% of films made before 1929 are lost forever". Deutsche Kinemathek estimates that 80–90% of silent films are gone; the film archive's own list contains over 3,500 lost films.

A study by the Library of Congress states that 75% of all silent films are now lost. While others dispute whether the percentage is quite that high, it is impractical to enumerate any but the more notable and those that can be sourced.

For example, roughly 200 out of over 500 Méliès' films and 350 out of over 1,000 of Alice Guy's films survive. Of approximately the 1,100 films made in India between 1912 and 1931, only 29 of them are known to have survived.

Notable lost films
Amongst the films commonly mourned among critics and film historians are early films by noted directors and films of unique cultural importance. The Mountain Eagle was the second film to be directed by Alfred Hitchcock in 1926; the silent melodrama has been described by the British Film Institute as their "most wanted" lost film. London After Midnight, starring Lon Chaney and directed by Tod Browning in 1927, was a silent-era mystery-thriller pseudo-vampire film that is now considered to be the 'holy grail' of lost films by collectors. Hollywood, a silent comedy film directed by James Cruze, featured over 30 cameo appearances from major stars of the day, including Roscoe "Fatty" Arbuckle, Charlie Chaplin, Mary Astor and Pola Negri, but no footage exists.

Silent films

1890s

1900s

1910s

1920s

Sound films
From 1929 on, films are "all-talking" unless otherwise specified.

1920s

1930s

1940s

1960s

1970s

1980s

References 

History of film